CCAT is the public school district containing the Charter Conservatory for Liberal Arts and Technology.  It is located in Bulloch County, Georgia, United States, based in Statesboro.

Schools
The CCAT school district has one charter school.

Charter school 
Charter Conservatory for Liberal Arts and Technology

References

External links
Ccat School District

School districts in Georgia (U.S. state)
Education in Bulloch County, Georgia